I'mperfect (stylised as i'mperfect) is the fifth studio album by the Japanese rock band Ling tosite Sigure, released on April 10, 2013. This album includes both their previous singles. The single "Abnormalize" was used as the opening theme for anime series, Psycho-Pass. The album was released in the UK and Europe by JPU Records.

Track listing
All tracks written and composed by Toru "TK" Kitajima.

References

External links 
 Ling tosite sigure discography 

2013 albums
Ling Tosite Sigure albums